The 1989–90 Magyar Kupa (English: Hungarian Cup) was the 51st season of Hungary's annual knock-out cup football competition.

Quarter-finals

|}

Semi-finals

|}

Final

See also
 1990–91 Nemzeti Bajnokság I

References

External links
 Official site 
 soccerway.com

1990–91 in Hungarian football
1990–91 domestic association football cups
1990-91